Oscar Soliz (born 9 January 1985) is a Bolivian road racing cyclist, who rides for Bolivian amateur team Potosí. Between 2017 and 2021, Soliz was suspended from the sport after testing positive for continuous erythropoietin receptor activator (CERA) at the 2017 Vuelta a Colombia.

Major results
Source:

2006
 1st Mountains classification Doble Sucre Potosí GP Cemento Fancesa
 7th Overall Doble Copacabana Grand Prix Fides
1st Mountains classification
2007
 1st Overall Doble Sucre Potosí GP Cemento Fancesa
1st Mountains classification
1st Stage 2
 1st Overall Vuelta al Lago Uru Uru
1st Stage 1
 1st Overall Tour of Cochabamba
 1st Overall Doble Copacabana Grand Prix Fides
1st Stage 4
2008
 1st  Time trial, National Road Championships
 1st Stage 2 Tour of Cochabamba
 2nd Overall Vuelta a Bolivia
2009
 National Road Championships
1st  Time trial
2nd Road race
 1st Overall Tour of Tarija
1st Stages 1a & 3
 1st Stage 1 GP Savina Cuellar
 2nd Overall Tour of Cochabamba
1st Stage 3
 2nd Overall Vuelta a Bolivia
1st Stages 6, 8 & 11 (ITT)
 5th Overall Vuelta al Lago Uru Uru
1st Stage 2
 6th Overall Doble Sucre Potosí GP Cemento Fancesa
1st Stage 3
2010
 National Road Championships
1st  Time trial
1st  Road race
 1st Overall Doble Sucre Potosí GP Cemento Fancesa
1st Stages 1, 2 & 5 (ITT)
 1st Overall Tour of Chaco
 1st Overall Vuelta al Lago Uru Uru
1st Prologue & Stage 2
 1st Overall Tour of Cochabamba
1st Prologue, Stages 1 & 3
 1st Overall Vuelta a Bolivia
1st Stages 4, 8 & 9 (ITT)
 1st Overall Tour of Camargo
1st Stages 1, 3 & 5
2011
 1st  Time trial, National Road Championships
 4th Overall Vuelta Ciclista a Costa Rica
1st Stage 12
 5th Overall Tour of Cundinamarca
2012
 National Road Championships
1st  Time trial
3rd Road race
 1st Overall Clasica International Tulcan
1st Stage 8
 4th Overall Vuelta a Bolivia
1st Mountains classification
1st Stages 7, 9b & 10a (ITT)
 5th Overall Vuelta a Boyacá
 8th Overall Clásico RCN
2013
 1st Overall Tour of Cotagaita
 1st Overall Vuelta al Sur de Bolivia
1st Mountains classification
1st Points classification
1st Stages 1, 2 (ITT) & 3
 1st Overall Tour of Cochabamba
1st Stage 2
 2nd Overall Vuelta a Bolivia
1st Mountains classification
1st Stages 7 & 10a (ITT)
2014
 National Road Championships
1st  Time trial
1st  Road race
 1st Overall Clásico RCN
1st Stages 6 & 10
 5th Time trial, South American Games
 7th Overall Vuelta a Colombia
2015
 National Road Championships
1st  Time trial
1st  Road race
 1st Overall Vuelta a Chuquisaca
1st Stages 1 & 3
 1st Stage 3 Vuelta a Cundinamarca
2016
 National Road Championships
1st  Time trial
1st  Road race
2017
8th Overall Vuelta a Colombia
2022
 3rd Time trial, National Road Championships

References

External links

1985 births
Bolivian male cyclists
Living people
People from Modesto Omiste Province
Cyclists at the 2016 Summer Olympics
Olympic cyclists of Bolivia